Shirur Anantpal is a town and headquarters of Shirur Anantpal Taluka in Latur district in the Indian state of Maharashtra.

Demographics
In the 2001 Indian census the village of was reported to have 8,682 inhabitants, with 4,535 males (52.2%) and 4,147 females (47.8%), for a ratio of 914 females per 1000 males.

Notes

Cities and towns in Latur district
Talukas in Maharashtra
Villages in Shirur Anantpal taluka